Miss World Mexico 2016, now referred to as Miss Mexico 2016, is the very first edition of a new pageant organization formed by Hugo Castellanos after Lupita Jones, president of Nuestra Belleza México (now Mexicana Universal), lost the franchise with Miss World. The pageant held at Teatro Morelos of Morelia, Michoacán on 14 October 2016 . 31 contestants of the Mexican Republic competed for the national title. Two winners were crowned in the end of the event, Miss World Mexico 2016/Miss Mexico 2016 and Miss World Mexico 2017/Miss Mexico 2017. Ana Girault of Ciudad de México (Mexico City) was crowned as the titleholder for 2016 and Andrea Meza of Chihuahua was crowned as the titleholder for 2017. Ana Girault represented Mexico at Miss World 2016 in the United States. Andrea Meza represented the country at Miss World 2017 in China.

Results

Placements

Judges

Final Judges
These are the members of the jury who evaluated the contestants:
José Medel - Beauty Contest Historian
Misael Espinoza - Models and Public Relations agent of the Queta Rojas Agency
Aldo Esparza - Mister Mexico 2016
Alejo Rios - Trainer of Misses in Los Angeles
Alejandro Mata - Fashion Designer

Preliminary Judges
These are the members of the preliminary jury, who chose the 16 semifinalists, after seeing the candidates in private during interviews and catwalk in swimsuits and gala:
José Medel - Beauty Contest Historian
Karla Carrillo - Nuestra Belleza México 2009, Model, Actress and Television Host
Aldo Esparza - Mister Mexico 2016
Dra. Vicky Benitez - Director of Modstil, a collaborator of Elite Mexico
Alejandro Mata - Fashion Designer

Candidates  
31 Candidates have been officially chosen

Challenges

Sports

Top Model

Beach Beauty

Beauty With a Purpose

Talent

Golf Challenge

Multimedia

Dances of México

About the contestants
  – Giovana Alfieri participated in Nuestra Belleza Aguascalientes 2015, and is the actual "Reina de la Feria de San Marcos".
  – Liliana Saucedo was Miss Earth Coahuila 2014 and Top 16 in Miss Earth México 2014.
  – Renata Aguirre resigned from the competition a few days before the finale because of online bullying. 
  – Yoanna Gutierrez won the Regional pageant of Señorita Turismo Región de los Altos in 2013.
  – Camila Villalvazo was Miss Teen Universe Nayarit 2015.
  – Veronica Sánchez who participated in Nuestra Belleza México 2012 resigned from the title after getting an offer for a job at an international model agency. Alejandra Delgadillo from Nuevo León takes the thrown of Miss San Luis Potosí 2016.
  – Melissa Lizarraga participated in Nuestra Belleza Sinaloa in 2015 and was placed as the first runner up.
 - Norhely Celaya participated in Nuestra Belleza Sonora 2009 where she was placed as the second runner up and was finalist in Nuestra Belleza Sonora 2011.
  – Yussihey Vidal was Miss Earth Tabasco 2011 and finished in second place (Miss Air Mexico or First Runner-Up) in Miss Earth Mexico 2011 and 2013 she won Flor Tabasco in representing to Jonuta.
  – Patricia Morato participated in Nuestra Belleza Tamualipas 2016, where she was placed as the first runner up.
  – Marilú Acevedo participated in Nuestra Belleza Veracruz 2012, where she was placed as the first runner up.
  - Roxana Reyes participated in Nuestra Belleza Zacatecas 2012, where she was placed as the 1st Runner-up.

References

2016 beauty pageants
Beauty pageants in Mexico
Miss World by country
2016 in Mexico